Erythrina fusca is a species of flowering tree in the legume family, Fabaceae. It is known by many common names, including purple coraltree, gallito, bois immortelle, bucayo, and the more ambiguous "bucare" and  "coral bean". E. fusca has the widest distribution of any Erythrina species; it is the only one found in both the New and Old World. It grows on coasts and along rivers in tropical Asia, Oceania, the Mascarene Islands, Madagascar, Africa, and the Neotropics.

The easy-to-grow and attractive flowering tree is cultivated as an ornamental shade and hedge plant. It is a common shade tree in cacao plantations. It attracts hummingbirds, which pollinate its flowers.

E. fusca is the official flower of the Venezuelan state of Trujillo.

Description
E. fusca is a deciduous tree with spiny bark and light orange flowers. Its legume pods reach  in length and contain dark brown seeds. The seeds are buoyant, allowing them disperse across oceans.  The tree is highly adapted to coastal conditions, tolerant of both flooding and salinity.

Like many other species in the genus Erythrina, E. fusca contains toxic alkaloids which have been utilized for medicinal value but are poisonous in larger amounts. The most common alkaloid is erythraline, which is named for the genus.

As food
The new buds and leaves are eaten as a vegetable. In Thailand fresh Erythrina fusca leaves are often eaten in Miang kham.

References

External links

New Crops Info Page
Genus Erythrina
Study: E. fusca as a protein supplement for cattle
Flowers, Pollination & Ocean Dispersal In Coral Trees (Erythrina) 

fusca
Trees of the Amazon
Pantropical flora
Flora of Tanzania
Flora of the Western Indian Ocean
Flora of tropical Asia
Trees of Central America
Trees of the Caribbean
Trees of northern South America
Trees of Brazil
Trees of western South America
Trees of Africa
Trees of the Pacific
Flora without expected TNC conservation status